Statistics of Superettan in season 2006.

Overview
It was contested by 16 teams, and Trelleborgs FF won the championship.

League table

Relegation play-offs

Sirius and Bunkeflo promoted to Superettan

Väsby United and Assyriska relegated to Division 1

Season statistics

Top scorers

Top assists

Top goalkeepers
(Minimum of 10 games played)

Footnotes

References
Sweden - List of final tables (Clas Glenning)

Superettan seasons
2
Sweden
Sweden